The 15633/15634/25631/25632 Bikaner–Guwahati Express is an Express train belonging to Northeast Frontier Railway zone that runs between  in Rajasthan and  in Assam in India. It is currently being operated with 15633/15634/25631/25632 train numbers on bi-weekly basis.

Service

25631  Bikaner–Guwahati Express has an average speed of 48 km/hr and covers 2314 km in 48h 25m.
25632 Guwahati–Bikaner Express  has an average speed of 52 km/hr and covers 2314 km in  44h 25m.

Route & Halts 

The important halts of the train are:

RAJASTHAN:
  (originates)
 
 
 
 
 

UTTAR PRADESH:
 
 
 
 
 Pt. Deen Dayal Upadhyaya Junction

BIHAR:
 
 
 
 

WEST BENGAL:
 
 New Jalpaiguri (Siliguri)
 
 

ASSAM:
 
 
 
 
  (terminates)

Coach composition

The train consists of 18 coaches:

 1 AC III Tier
 5 Sleeper coaches
 2 General
 1 Pantry car
 2 Second-class Luggage/parcel van

Traction

From Katihar Junction it is hauled by a -based WDM-3A twins locomotive for the remainder of the journey until Guwahati, and vice versa.

Rake sharing

Reversal

The train reverses its direction once:

Accident

On January 13, 2022, Bikaner Guwahati Express got derailed between New Domohani and New Maynaguri railway station near Jalpaiguri in West Bengal at around 5 pm IST.

See also 

 Bikaner Junction railway station
 Guwahati railway station
 Barmer–Guwahati Express
 Mainaguri train accident - On 13 January 2022, Bikaner–Guwahati Express train derailed near Mainaguri, Jalpaiguri district, West Bengal.

Notes

References

External links 
 25631/Bikaner–Guwahati Express India Rail Info
 25632/Guwahati–Bikaner Express India Rail Info

Transport in Guwahati
Transport in Bikaner
Rail transport in Rajasthan
Rail transport in Bihar
Rail transport in Uttar Pradesh
Rail transport in West Bengal
Rail transport in Assam
Express trains in India